The Sit (Сить) is a tributary of the Rybinsk Reservoir (nominally, of the Mologa). The river flows for  through Sonkovsky District of Tver Oblast and Nekouzsky and Breytovsky Districts of Yaroslavl Oblasts of Russia before entering the Rybinsk Reservoir near the large village of Breitovo.

The river gives its name to the bloody Battle of the Sit River (1238). In the Middle Ages the valley of the Sit belonged to a branch of the princely House of Yaroslavl. The princes of the Sit', or Sitsky, joined the service of the Grand Dukes of Muscovy in the 15th century. The family survived into the 17th century and was closely related by blood to the Romanovs.

The source of the Sit is in the north of Sonkovsky District, close to the village of Saburovo. The river flows northeast, enters Yaroslavl Oblast, and turns south. By the selo of Voznesenskoye it turns east and eventually north. The mouth of the Sit is in the selo of Breytovo. Before the Rybinsk Reservoir was filled, the Sit was a tributary of the Mologa River.

The drainage basin of the sit includes the eastern part of Krasnokholmsky District of Tver Oblast, the eastern part of Sonkovsky District, the western part of Nekouzsky District, and some areas in Breytovsky District. The district centers Sonkovo and Breytovo lie in the drainage basin of the Sit.

In the early 20th century the valley of the Sit River was home to the Sitskari (ru), an ethnic group of short fair-haired people speaking a Northern dialect of the Russian language. It is thought that they had a mixture of Lithuanian or some other Baltic ancestry.

References 

Rivers of Yaroslavl Oblast
Rivers of Tver Oblast